McClymont is a surname. Notable people with the surname include:

Brooke McClymont (born 1981), Australian singer-songwriter
Gregg McClymont (born 1976), Scottish politician
Gordon McClymont (1920-2000), Australian agricultural scientist
Kate McClymont, Australian journalist
Samantha McClymont (born 1986), Australian singer-songwriter
Thomas McClymont, New Zealand rugby league player
Willie McClymont (born 1953), Scottish footballer